Fijaš is a village and municipality in the Svidník District, in the Prešov Region of north-eastern Slovakia.

History
In historical records the village was first mentioned in 1414.

Geography
The municipality lies at an altitude of 240 metres in the Ondavská Highlands, and covers an area of 4.402 km². It has a population of about 150 people.

Genealogical resources

The records for genealogical research are available at the state archive "Statny Archiv in Presov, Slovakia"

 Roman Catholic church records (births/marriages/deaths): 1775-1895 (parish B)
 Greek Catholic church records (births/marriages/deaths): 1860-1901 (parish B)

See also
 List of municipalities and towns in Slovakia

External links
 
 
https://web.archive.org/web/20080111223415/http://www.statistics.sk/mosmis/eng/run.html 
Surnames of living people in Fijas

Villages and municipalities in Svidník District
Šariš